Rheece Evans (born 28 August 1990) is a South African football player who played as a defender and midfielder.

The lanky defender was bought in to bolster an already formidable back four in the winter of 2014 and will look to break into the first XI immediately. 
He was brought to Sundowns after having an impressive season at Maritzburg United. He is seen as a very speedy and offensive right back.

References

1990 births
Living people
Sportspeople from Durban
White South African people
South African soccer players
Association football defenders
Association football midfielders
Maritzburg United F.C. players
Mamelodi Sundowns F.C. players
Cape Town Spurs F.C. players